PNEUROP is the European Association of manufacturers of compressors, vacuum pumps, pneumatic tools and allied equipment, represented by their national associations.

History
The compressed air trade associations of France, Germany and the UK formed a trading organization in 1958. In 1960, more countries joined and it became PNEUROP.

PNEUROP celebrated its formal 50th anniversary on 6 November 2008 by organizing a conference in Brussels with its programme and presentations by the different committees.

Function
PNEUROP speaks on behalf of its members in European and international forums concerning the harmonisation of technical, normative and legislative developments in the field of compressors, vacuum pumps, pneumatic tools and allied equipment.

The association is cooperating with and contributing to several ISO committees including TC 112 (Vacuum Technology) and TC 118 (Compressor).

PNEUROP is committed to develop energy efficiency and environmental protection among its member organizations and members, as explained in a recent official statement.
Pneurop supports the overall sustainable energy policy objectives of the European Union and its member companies actively promote energy efficiency as part of their daily business activity.

Pneurop is registered under the European Union 'Transparency Register' - ID number: 67236492080-88

"Air Everywhere" 

The PNEUROP General Assembly officially approved the launch of a new project entitled “Pneurop Green Challenge 2020". Through this project, manufacturers, represented by their national associations, wish to draw attention to the importance of their equipment which is vital in reaching Europe's 2020 goals in terms of energy savings, development of renewable energy and a reduction in  emissions.
Compressors and vacuum pumps are used not only in projects for storage of CO2 but also in the manufacture of photovoltaic cells and in the transport and storage of hydrogen. These examples are part of the vast list of products and applications which professionals would like to make better known to the general public.

This determination to develop and promote these technologies of the future is the consequence of the industry's long-held commitment to reduce the environmental impact of the different production phases, to develop an ecologically sound approach to product design, and to encourage recycling of products.

Sustainability projects and low carbon initiatives need compressed air, gas and vacuum equipment. This is formalized under a signature and a logo "Air Everywhere".

Ecodesign 
Pneurop is an active stakeholder of the Ecodesign Preparatory Study on Electric motor systems/compressors (Ener Lot 31)

Structure
PNEUROP's office is located in BluePoint in Brussels. The work is achieved through product network :
 Compressors
 Tools
 Vacuum technology
 Pressure equipment
 Air treatment
 Process compressors

PNEUROP is an international brand/trade name that was registered in 2007 with its logo.

Member organizations
  Orgalime
  FMMI
  Agoria
  Technology Industries of Finland
  Profluid
  VDMA - Compressors, Compressed Air and Vacuum Technology
  
  Teknikforetagen
  Swissmem
  Association of Machine Manufacturers MÝB
  British Compressed Air Society Limited - BCAS
 ISO International Organization for Standardization ISO

References

External links 
 Pneurop website

Vacuum pumps
Pneumatics
Trade associations based in Belgium
Pan-European trade and professional organizations
Organizations established in 1960